Paulina Patience Tangoba Abagaye is a Ghanaian diplomat and a member of the New Patriotic Party of Ghana. She is Ghana's former ambassador to Italy. She was the current Upper East Regional Minister.

Ambassadorial appointment
In July 2017, President Nana Akuffo-Addo named Paulina Abagaye as Ghana's ambassador to Italy. She was among twenty two other distinguished Ghanaians who were named to head various diplomatic Ghanaian mission in the world. In December 2020, Abagaye was the NPP in a Navrongo Central parliamentary election, but was unsuccessful.

References

Year of birth missing (living people)
Living people
Ambassadors of Ghana to Italy
Ghanaian women ambassadors
Ambassadors of Ghana to Serbia
Ambassadors of Ghana to Slovenia